Royal Mitchell is a paralympic athlete from the United States competing mainly in category T13 sprint events.

Royal Mitchell competed in the 2000 Summer Paralympics in all three T13 sprints winning the gold medal in the 400m. He defended this title in 2004 and added the 100m gold as well as competing in the 200m and the 4 × 100 m. He did the same events in 2008 but could not defend any of his titles and went home with no silverware to his name.

References

External links 
 
 

Year of birth missing (living people)
Living people
Paralympic track and field athletes of the United States
Athletes (track and field) at the 2000 Summer Paralympics
Athletes (track and field) at the 2004 Summer Paralympics
Athletes (track and field) at the 2008 Summer Paralympics
Paralympic gold medalists for the United States
American male sprinters
Medalists at the 2000 Summer Paralympics
Medalists at the 2004 Summer Paralympics
Paralympic medalists in athletics (track and field)
Medalists at the 2007 Parapan American Games
Visually impaired sprinters
Paralympic sprinters